The 2002 All-Ireland Minor Hurling Championship was the 72nd staging of the All-Ireland Minor Hurling Championship. The championship began on 14 April 2002 and ended on 8 September 2002.

Cork entered the championship as defending champions, however, they were defeated by Galway in the All-Ireland quarter-final.

On 8 September 2002, Kilkenny won the championship after a 3-15 to 1-07 defeat of Tipperary in the All-Ireland final at Croke Park. This was their 17th championship title overall and their first title since 1993.

Wexford's Richard Flynn was the championship's top scorer with 4-23.

Results

Leinster Minor Hurling Championship

Group A

Group B

Semi-finals

Final

Munster Minor Hurling Championship

Quarter-finals

Semi-finals

Final

Ulster Minor Hurling Championship

Semi-final

Final

All-Ireland Minor Hurling Championship

Quarter-finals

Semi-finals

Final

Championship statistics

Top scorers

Top scorers overall

Top scorers in a single game

Miscellaneous

 On 13 April 2002, Carlow defeated Laois in the Leinster Championship for the first time since 1956.
 Carlow's score of 7-21 against Wicklow was their highest ever points tally in the history of the Leinster Championship.

External links
 All-Ireland Minor Hurling Championship: Roll Of Honour

References

Minor
All-Ireland Minor Hurling Championship